The 2004 AFL season was the 108th season of the Australian Football League (AFL), the highest level senior Australian rules football competition in Australia, which was known as the Victorian Football League until 1989. The season featured sixteen clubs, ran from 26 March until 25 September, and comprised a 22-game home-and-away season followed by a finals series featuring the top eight clubs.

The premiership was won by the Port Adelaide Football Club for the first time, after it defeated  by 40 points in the 2004 AFL Grand Final.

AFL Draft
See 2004 AFL Draft.

Wizard Home Loans Cup

The Wizard Home Loans Cup final saw St Kilda defeat Geelong 1.14.5 (98) to 1.10.7 (76) in front of a crowd of 50,533.

Premiership season

Round 1

Round 2

Round 3

Round 4

Round 5

Round 6

Round 7

Round 8

Round 9

Round 10

Round 11

Round 12

Round 13

Round 14

Round 15

Round 16

Round 17

Round 18

Round 19

Round 20

Round 21

Round 22

Ladder

Ladder progression

Finals series

Week one

Week two

Week three

Week four

Match attendance

Total match attendance for all games was 5,915,407. Attendance at the grand final was 77,671. The largest non-finals attendance was 60,898 people for the Collingwood v Carlton game in round 22.

Attendances during the season were affected by the ongoing reconstruction of the Ponsford, Olympic and Melbourne Cricket Club stands at the MCG to be ready for the 2006 Commonwealth Games.

Awards
 The Brownlow Medal was awarded to Chris Judd of West Coast.
 The Leigh Matthews Trophy was awarded to Nick Riewoldt of St Kilda.
 The Coleman Medal was awarded to Fraser Gehrig of St Kilda.
 The Norm Smith Medal was awarded to Byron Pickett of Port Adelaide.
 The AFL Rising Star award was awarded to Jared Rivers of Melbourne.
 The Wooden Spoon was "awarded" to Richmond for coming last.

Coleman

Notable events
  won its first ten matches of the season, which was at that time the longest winning streak in its history. This record stood until 2009, when the Saints won 19 games in a row.
 A five-minute brawl broke out between rivals Hawthorn and Essendon in the round 11 match, after which one Bomber (Justin Murphy) and four Hawks players received suspensions totalling 16 matches, and a combined total of $70,700 of fines were handed out.  27 charges were brought before the AFL Tribunal, the most ever from a single game. The game is widely known as the "Line in the Sand" match as the brawls were sparked in the third quarter after Hawthorn players were urged at a half-time address by club legend Dermott Brereton to metaphorically draw such a line; Brereton thought the young Hawks were being physically intimidated by the more experienced Bombers.
The win broke a 10-game winning streak for Brisbane against Geelong.
Ayres subsequently resigned on the same day, without shaking hands or a word with the media. He was replaced by Neil Craig at first on a temporary basis, but then got the job permanently for 2005 and onwards.
Most of the Sydney players were upset and distracted as Jackson was given CPR on the interchange bench; and despite Sydney having led the Kangaroos by 40 points at three-quarter time, they faded to lose by six points.
 With its round 22 win over Adelaide,  clinched its third consecutive minor premiership, a feat achieved by only two other clubs in the previous 50 seasons ( 1955-60;  1999-2001). This would later prove crucial in relation to home ground advantage at the preliminary final stage.
 Despite earning a home preliminary final by beating St Kilda two weeks earlier, the Brisbane Lions were forced to play Geelong in Melbourne at the MCG, due to an agreement between the AFL and the MCG to play at least one match per week at the ground in finals. This contractual stipulation was removed following renegotiation the following season.

Notes

References
 2004 Season – AFL Tables

 
Australian Football League seasons
2004 in Australian rules football